Thiococcus is a Gram-negative, non‐motile, obligately phototrophic and strictly anaerobic genus of bacteria from the family of Chromatiaceae with one known species (Thiococcus pfennigii). Thiococcus pfennigii was first isolated from salt marshes.

References

Further reading 
 

Chromatiales
Bacteria genera
Monotypic bacteria genera
Taxa described in 1998